Hüseyin Avni Lifij (1886, Ladik - 2 June 1927, Istanbul) was a Turkish impressionist painter of Circassian origin. He is best known for landscapes with architectural features.

Biography
His family emigrated from Sochi to Ladik during the Great Circassian exile of 1864. He began his education in 1896, in Istanbul; showing special interest in the art and music classes. In 1898, he continued his studies at the "Numune-i Terakki Mektebi", a private school where he learned French. Three years later, he obtained a position in the Railways Department of the "Ottoman Ministry of Public Works". While there, he continued taking lessons to improve his French. He also audited classes at a medical school and a pharmacists' school to learn anatomy and chemistry.

In 1906, he met the French architect, Henri Prost, who liked his work and recommended that he show some of his paintings to Osman Hamdi Bey, who was impressed with Lifij's "Self-Portrait with Pipe" and, after seeing more of his work, placed him on a list of candidates for a state scholarship to study in Paris. In late 1908, he was selected and, a few months later, enrolled at the École des Beaux-Arts, where he studied with Fernand Cormon.

Upon returning home in 1912, he obtained a position teaching at Istanbul High School. In 1915, he began teaching French at the Kandilli Anatolian High School for Girls. The following year, he participated in the first "Galatasaray Exhibition", which would later become a major venue for new artists. In 1918, he presented 18 canvases at an exhibition in Vienna devoted to war paintings.

In 1922, he and his wife went to a teacher's conference in Bursa, where they met President Atatürk. They were invited to spend four months with the President in Ankara,  where he produced several portraits, including one of Marshall Fevzi Çakmak, and began one of his best-known paintings, "Karagün" (Black Day). In 1924, he was appointed a Professor at the "Sanayi-i Nefise Mektebi" (School of Fine Arts, now part of the Mimar Sinan Fine Arts University), a position he retained until his sudden death at the early age of forty-one, apparently from a heart attack.

References

Further reading
 Veysel Uğurlu, Hüseyin Avni Lifij, (exhibition ctalog), Yapı Kredi Kültür Sanat Yayıncılık, 1997
 Ahmet Kâmil Gören, Avni Lifij (Vol.7 of "Turkish Painters"), Yapı Kredi yayınları 2001,

External links 
 
 Avni Lifij website , with biography, paintings and additional references
 More paintings by Lifij @ Sergiler
 Brief biography and paintings @ e-stanbul.com
 "The Art of Avni Lifij" an appreciation by Şazi Sirel @ the Turkish Cultural Foundation

1886 births
1927 deaths
People from Lâdik
Landscape painters
Turkish people of Circassian descent
20th-century Turkish painters